Folketing elections were held in Denmark on 20 May 1913. Although the Social Democratic Party received the most votes, Venstre won the most seats. Voter turnout was 74.5%.

Results

References

Elections in Denmark
Denmark
Folketing election
Denmark